Philip Stanhope  may refer to:
 Philip Stanhope (Royalist officer), English Civil War Royalist colonel
 Philip Stanhope, 1st Earl of Chesterfield (1584–1656), English peer
 Philip Stanhope, 2nd Earl of Chesterfield (1634–1714), English peer, grandson of the 1st Earl
 Philip Stanhope, 3rd Earl of Chesterfield (1673–1726), English peer, son of the 2nd Earl
 Philip Stanhope, 4th Earl of Chesterfield (1694–1793), English peer, son of the 3rd Earl
 Philip Stanhope (diplomat) (1732–1768), illegitimate son of the 4th Earl of Chesterfield and recipient of his Letters
 Philip Stanhope, 5th Earl of Chesterfield (1755–1815), British Ambassador to Spain, 1784–1786, and Master of the Mint, 1789–1790, adopted son of the 4th Earl
 Philip Stanhope, 2nd Earl Stanhope (1714–1786), son of the 1st Earl
 Philip Henry Stanhope, 4th Earl Stanhope (1781–1855), English politician
 Philip Stanhope, 5th Earl Stanhope (1805–1875), English historian, son of the 4th Earl
 Philip Stanhope, 1st Baron Weardale (1847–1923), British Liberal politician